Arribes del Duero Natural Park is a protected area in western Spain, covering 106.105 ha in the autonomous community of Castile and León. In this area the river Duero forms the national boundary between Spain and Portugal, and the Portuguese side is also protected under the Douro International Natural Park.
The most notable characteristics of this natural space are its biodiversity and range of watercourses, which have eroded deep valleys and vertiginous precipices. This landscape is known as Arribes, which is where the reserve name comes from.

Fauna
The park is a Special Protection Area, recognised by European Union for birds such as the black stork.

See also
Douro International Natural Park
Arribes
Sayago

Natural parks of Spain
Protected areas of Castile and León
2002 establishments in Spain
Canyons and gorges of Spain
Landforms of Castile and León
Protected areas established in 2002
Special Protection Areas of Spain